Ahmed Osman Hassan Elmi is a Somali politician, who is currently serving as the Governor of Sanaag region of Somaliland since June 2020, replacing Mohammed Ahmed Alin.

References 

Governors of Sanaag
Year of birth missing (living people)
Living people